Portugal competed at the 1920 Summer Olympics in Antwerp, Belgium. A delegation of thirteen competitors participated in two sports, however no medals were won.

Fencing

Shooting

References

External links
Official Olympic Reports
International Olympic Committee results database
1920 Olympians from Portugal

Nations at the 1920 Summer Olympics
1920
Olympics